is a Japanese politician of the New Komeito Party, a member of the House of Councillors in the Diet (national legislature). A native of Hiroshima Prefecture and graduate of Kyoto University, she joined the Ministry of Foreign Affairs in 1995, attending Istanbul University while in the ministry. In 2001, after leaving the ministry, she was elected to the House of Councillors for the first time.

References

External links 
  in Japanese.

Members of the House of Councillors (Japan)
Kyoto University alumni
Istanbul University alumni
1971 births
Living people
New Komeito politicians
21st-century Japanese politicians